A gale is a very strong wind.

Gale may also refer to:

Places

United States
 Gale, Illinois, a village
 Gale, Indiana, an unincorporated community
 Gale Peak, a mountain in California
 Gale, West Virginia, an unincorporated community
 Gale, Wisconsin, a town
 Gale River, New Hampshire

Elsewhere
 Gale (crater), on Mars
 Praia da Galé, a beach in Portugal
 Gale (Chalcidice), an ancient Greek colony of Chalcis on Chalkidiki peninsula

People and fictional characters
 Gale (given name)
 Gale (surname)
 George Gale (cartoonist) (1929–2003), who drew under the name Gale
 Gale (mythology), a Greek mythological witch

Other uses
 Gale (publisher), a publisher of reference books and databases, formerly known as the Gale Group, then Thomson Gale
 Gale College, a defunct college in Wisconsin, US
 HMNZS Gale (T04), a minesweeper of the Royal New Zealand Navy
 Gale, a variant of the Shannon switching game 
 Gale, a parcel of land leased to a Freeminer for mining, principally in the Forest of Dean, England
 Gale, a Brass-Era automobile manufactured by Western Tool Works in Galesburg, Illinois, US
 Global Autonomous Language Exploitation (GALE), a DARPA-funded research program

See also
 Myrica gale, a plant also known as sweet gale, used for flavouring
 Gael
 Gail (disambiguation)
 Gales (disambiguation)
 Gayle (disambiguation)
 Galesville (disambiguation), including Galeville